Southbound is the fourteenth studio album by American rock band The Doobie Brothers featuring collaborations with various artists in remakes of various hits by the band. It was the group's only album that featured Tony Pia since he joined the band in 2010 before leaving the group in August 2016 since Hossack's retirement due to cancer and his death in 2012. And it was also the band's last studio album to feature keyboardist / vocalist Guy Allison before his departure from the group in October the following year in 2015.

Track listing

Personnel
Credits taken from album's liner notes.

The Doobie Brothers
 Tom Johnston - lead vocals , electric guitar , backing vocals , guitar solo and acoustic guitar 
 Patrick Simmons - lead vocals , lead guitar , acoustic guitar , backing vocals 
 John McFee - electric guitar , banjo , autoharp , fiddle , guitar solo , steel guitar solo , slide resonator guitar , backing vocals 
 Michael McDonald - lead vocals and keyboards , backing vocals

Additional musicians

 Zac Brown - lead vocals 
 Tom Bukovac - electric guitar 
 Clay Cook - backing vocals 
 J. T. Corenflos - electric guitar 
 John Cowan - backing vocals 
 Jimmy De Martini - fiddle & backing vocals 
 Dan Dugmore - steel guitar , dobro 
 Sara Evans - lead vocals 
 Tyler Farr - lead vocals 
 Shannon Forrest - drums 
 Vince Gill - guitar solo 
 Eric Gunderson - lead vocals 
 Vicki Hampton - backing vocals 
 Hunter Hayes - guitar 
 Aubrey Haynie - fiddle 
 John Driskell Hopkins - backing vocals 
 Larry Hall - violin, viola, cello, & orchestration ; trombone & trumpet 
 Dann Huff - guitar solo 
 Casey James - lead vocals & guitar solo 
 Charlie Judge - keyboards 
 Toby Keith - lead vocals 
 Huey Lewis - harmonica 
 Stephen Barker Liles - lead vocals 
 Tony Lucido - bass 
 Chris McHugh - drums 
 Jerry McPherson - electric guitar 
 Wendy Moten - backing vocals 
 Jerrod Niemann - lead vocals 
 Brad Paisley - lead vocals & lead guitar 
 Michael Rojas - keyboards 
 Blake Shelton - lead vocals 
 Tommy Sims - bass 
 Jimmie Lee Sloas - bass 
 Amanda Sudano-Ramirez - lead vocals 
 Bryan Sutton - acoustic guitar , mandolin 
 Ilya Toshinsky - acoustic guitar , banjo , bouzouki , mandolin 
 Charlie Worsham - lead vocals & banjo 
 Chris Young - lead vocals

Chart performance

References

2014 albums
The Doobie Brothers albums
Arista Records albums
Vocal duet albums
Albums produced by David Huff (drummer)